Hontokalo Creek is a stream in the U.S. state of Mississippi.

Hontokalo is a name derived from the Choctaw language meaning "seven". Variant names are "Honlookato Creek" and "Utucklo Creek".

References

Rivers of Mississippi
Rivers of Scott County, Mississippi
Mississippi placenames of Native American origin